Center for Vital Longevity (CVL) is a research center of the University of Texas at Dallas. CVL houses scientists studying the cognitive neuroscience of aging and ways to maintain cognitive health for life. Researchers at the CVL also investigate how to slow cognitive aging and methods for the early detection of age-related neurodegenerative disorders, such as Alzheimer's disease. Other research includes studies investigating the cognitive neuroscience of memory, and other fundamental cognitive processes.

History 

Founded in 2010 by Dr. Denise C. Park, the current director of research, the Center was joined by current director Michael D. Rugg in 2011. Both Park and Rugg are fellows of the American Association for the Advancement of Science (AAAS) and the Association for Psychological Science and hold distinguished chairs in the UT Dallas School of Behavioral and Brain Sciences. Seven full-time faculty belong to the Center, with each faculty member leading a research group comprising a mixture of postdoctoral fellows, graduate students and research assistants.

Center researchers are supported by several competitively reviewed research grants. These grants fund recently completed and ongoing research programs. Among these are the “Synapse Project,” led by Park, which tested the hypothesis that leading an engaged lifestyle facilitates brain health and may slow down the process of normal cognitive aging, as well as two large-scale studies examining brain structure and function across the course of a healthy lifespan.

Center investigators maintain affiliations and research collaborations with local, national, and international universities including UT Southwestern Medical Center, UT Arlington, University of Illinois, University of Michigan, University of Pennsylvania, Duke National University of Singapore, and University College London. Research articles by Center scientists have appeared in such peer-reviewed scientific journals as Proceedings of the National Academy of Sciences of the United States of America, Neuron (journal), Nature Neuroscience, Journal of Cognitive Neuroscience, Journal of Neuroscience, and Neuropsychologia.

Research 
Scientists at the Center for Vital Longevity are engaged in a variety of research studies aimed at understanding memory, cognitive aging, and Alzheimer’s Disease. Recent CVL studies use structural and functional neuroimaging technologies to understand changes that occur in the brain over a lifetime and how these changes affect specific cognitive abilities and behaviors
The Center’s six laboratories include:

Advisory Council 

The Center for Vital Longevity has an Advisory Council consisting of roughly 20 members, each serving three-year terms. The goal of the Advisory Council is to enhance the Center’s development and help promote its research on the aging mind. Council members are committed to the identification, cultivation, solicitation and stewardship of donors and potential donors, including corporate partners, foundations, individuals and others.

Facilities 

The Center’s facilities, in Dallas, Texas, include several research laboratories, including those dedicated to EEG and trans-cranial magnetic stimulation (TMS). Investigators conduct functional and structural neuroimaging studies at the Advanced Imaging Research Center (AIRC) on the nearby campus of the University of Texas Southwestern Medical Center part of a collaborative enterprise between UT Dallas, UT Arlington and UT Southwestern.

External links 
 Center for Vital Longevity 
 CVL Research

References 

University of Texas at Dallas